Trans-NED-19 is a drug which acts as a potent and selective antagonist of the endogenous calcium channel opener nicotinic acid adenine dinucleotide phosphate (NAADP), thereby reducing the normal NAADP-mediated calcium flux without blocking calcium channels directly. It is used in research into the functions of NAADP signalling inside many different cell types.

References 

Beta-Carbolines
Phenylpiperazines
Tryptamines